Lake Magenta is an ephemeral salt lake in the Wheatbelt area of Western Australia.

The lake is part of the  Lake Magenta Nature Reserve as is the bushland to the west of the lake. The area is in relatively pristine condition and contains a rich array of flora and fauna. Water quality and the health of vegetation has begun to decline in the area as salinity of surface runoff has increased and groundwater levels have risen.

Lake Magenta has a wetland area located to the south, and is on the southern end of an  chain of lakes from Lake Biddy in the north, through Lake Stubbs (and the town of Newdegate), Lake Buchan and Lake Lockhart. There are three other lakes nearby to the east: Lake Morris, Lake Royston and Lake Cobham.

The lake is a broad flat-floored valley with long paleo-drainages to the north and more steeply incised drainage lines to the south. The soils in the area are described as siliceous and calcareous loamy soils of minimal development. The rest of the area is composed of hard and sandy alkaline yellow and mottled sands.

See also

 List of lakes of Western Australia

References 

Magenta
Magenta